Triacetelus is a genus of beetles in the family Cerambycidae, containing the following species:

 Triacetelus emarginatus (Chevrolat, 1862)
 Triacetelus sericatus Bates, 1892
 Triacetelus viridipennis Chemsak & Linsley, 1976

References

Trachyderini
Cerambycidae genera